Chrysoscota albomaculata is a moth of the family Erebidae.

It was described by Walter Rothschild in 1912. It is found in Papua New Guinea and prefers mountainous areas.

References

Lithosiina
Moths described in 1912